Dereham is a town in Norfolk, England, sometimes called East Dereham

Dereham may also refer to:

 West Dereham, village in Norfolk, England
 Elias of Dereham (died 1246), English master stonemason
 Francis Dereham (c.1513–1541), English courtier
 Sir Thomas Dereham, 4th Baronet (c.1678–1739), English scientist and Jacobite

See also
 Derham (disambiguation)
 Battle of Deorham